Habib Galhia (May 14, 1941 – December 25, 2011) was a Tunisian boxer, who won the bronze medal in the men's Light Welterweight (67 kg) category at the 1964 Summer Olympics in Tokyo, Japan. He was the first Tunisian to win an Olympic medal.

Habib participated also in 1968 Summer Olympics in Mexico City and he finished the competition in the rank 17T.

1964 Olympic results
Below is the record of Habib Galhia, a Tunisian light welterweight boxer who competed at the 1964 Tokyo Olympics:

 Round of 32: defeated Willem Gerlach (Netherlands) by decision, 3-2
 Round of16: defeated Om Presand Pun (Nepal) by knockout
 Quarterfinal: defeated Felix Betancourt (Cuba) by knockout
 Semifinal: lost to Yevgeny Frovlov (Soviet Union) by decision, 0-5 (was awarded bronze medal)

References

External links
 Habib Galhia Olympic Database

1941 births
2011 deaths
Olympic boxers of Tunisia
Boxers at the 1964 Summer Olympics
Boxers at the 1968 Summer Olympics
Olympic bronze medalists for Tunisia
People from Kairouan
Olympic medalists in boxing
Tunisian male boxers
Medalists at the 1964 Summer Olympics
Light-welterweight boxers
20th-century Tunisian people